5 Live Sport is the banner of live sports coverage on BBC Radio 5 Live. The regular presenters are Mark Chapman (Monday, Wednesday and Saturday), Kelly Cates (Tuesday), Steve Crossman (Thursday and Sunday) and Darren Fletcher (Friday). The programme is on air MondayWednesday 710:30pm; ThursdayFriday 7 10pm; and weekends 126pm (although broadcast times are often extended, depending on ongoing events).

History
5 Live Sport evolved from the Saturday afternoon radio sports programme Sport on 2, which started on BBC Radio 2 on 4 April 1970. It changed its name to Sport on 5 on 1 September 1990 following the transfer of BBC Radio's sports coverage to the newly launched BBC Radio 5. The programme continued to be called Sport on 5 following the replacement of BBC Radio 5 with BBC Radio 5 Live in March 1994. The 5 Live Sport name has been used since 2006.

Format

Original format
The original format featured the major sports events each Saturday afternoon, broadcasting between 1:30pm and 5pm, with updates from the major footballing fixtures and second half commentary on a top match. The location of the commentary game would usually be revealed around 3pm. Sports Report then followed at 5pm.

Current format
The main focus of the programme, especially between August and May, is still on the football season, and in particular the Premier League. 5 Live Sport has live Premier League commentaries on Saturdays at 3 pm and 5:30 pm, Sundays at 2pm and 4:30pm and Monday nights at 8pm. They also have live commentaries from the Champions League and FA Cup. The programme also has extensive coverage of the England national team. Mark Chapman is the main presenter. Other major events such as the Formula One (European cities only), Six Nations and The Ashes are also aired. In the summer, major sporting events such as the Olympics, the Commonwealth Games, Wimbledon and the Open are all given extensive coverage.

Presenters

Nick Bright
Kelly Cates
Mark Chapman
Steve Crossman
Darren Fletcher
Tom Fordyce
Jeanette Kwakye
Sonja McLaughlan
Colin Murray
Eleanor Oldroyd
Gigi Salmon 
Emma Saunders

Correspondents

 Boxing - Mike Costello
 Cricket - Jonathan Agnew
 Football - John Murray
 Golf - Iain Carter
 Rugby League - Dave Woods
 Rugby Union - Chris Jones
 Tennis - Russell Fuller

Reporters
 Athletics - Sonja McLaughlan
 Cricket - Adam Mountford, Nikesh Rughani
 Football - John Acres, Robyn Cowen, Juliette Ferrington, Roddy Forsyth, Pat Murphy, Rob Nothman Jacqui Oatley, Aaron Paul, Will Perry, Nikesh Rughani, John Southall, Chris Wise
 Formula One - Jennie Gow

Commentators
 Athletics - Mike Costello and Ed Harry
 Cricket - Jonathan Agnew, Charles Dagnall, Isa Guha, Alison Mitchell, Henry Moeran
 Football - Alistair Bruce-Ball, Ian Dennis, Alan Green, Conor McNamara, John Murray, Vicki Sparks Arlo White
 Formula One - Jack Nicholls
 Golf - Alistair Bruce-Ball, Iain Carter, Conor McNamara, John Murray
 Racing - John Hunt
 Rugby League - Dave Woods and Stuart Pyke
 Rugby Union - Iain Carter, Chris Jones, Conor McNamara, Sara Orchard
 Tennis - Russell Fuller, David Law, Gigi Salmon

Pundits
 Athletics - Darren Campbell, Allison Curbishley, Jeanette Kwakye
 Boxing - Steve Bunce
 Cricket - James Anderson, Ebony Rainford-Brent, Alec Stewart, Phil Tufnell, Michael Vaughan
 Cycling - Rob Hayles
 Football - Michael Brown, Rachel Brown, Karen Carney, Lee Dixon, Dion Dublin, Jermaine Jenas, Mark Lawrenson, Clinton Morrison, Leon Osman, Pat Nevin, Micah Richards, Robbie Savage, Alan Shearer, Chris Sutton, Andy Townsend, Stephen Warnock, Ian Wright
 Formula One - Jolyon Palmer
 Rugby Union - Danny Care, Matt Dawson, Paul Grayson, Ugo Monye
 Tennis - Pat Cash, John McEnroe, Mark Woodforde

Podcasts

606
Boxing with Costello and Bunce
Chequered Flag Formula One
Fighting Talk
Football Daily
72+ EFL Podcast
Rugby League
Rugby Union Weekly
Sport Specials
Tailenders
Test Match Special
That Peter Crouch Podcast
The Doosra
The Squad

See also
 Sports Report

References

BBC Radio 5 Live programmes
British sports radio programmes